Ámbar Gillians Torres Paz (born 21 December 1994) is an Ecuadorian footballer who plays as a forward for Ecuadorian women's football championship side Club Ñañas and the Ecuador women's national team. She was part of the Ecuadorian squad for the 2015 FIFA Women's World Cup.

References

External links
 
 Profile  at FEF
 

1994 births
Living people
Sportspeople from Guayaquil
Ecuadorian women's footballers
Women's association football forwards
S.D. Quito footballers
L.D.U. Quito Femenino players
University of Rio Grande alumni
College women's soccer players in the United States
Ecuador women's international footballers
2015 FIFA Women's World Cup players
Ecuadorian expatriate footballers
Ecuadorian expatriate sportspeople in the United States
Expatriate women's soccer players in the United States
21st-century Ecuadorian women